Edward N. Wilson, Jr. (1925 – November 26, 1996) was an African-American sculptor.  His work was featured in the landmark 1976 exhibition Two Centuries of Black American Art.

References

1925 births
1996 deaths
African-American sculptors
Artists from Baltimore
20th-century American sculptors
20th-century American male artists
American male sculptors
Binghamton University faculty
People from Vestal, New York
Sculptors from Maryland
20th-century African-American artists